"DMV" is a song by the American rock band Primus. It was released on their 1993 album Pork Soda and also as a single.

The video was featured in Beavis and Butt-head.

It has been played live on Lollapalooza '93 and some concerts of 2003 Tour de Fromage.

This song is also featured in Animals Should Not Try to Act Like People and in the compilation album They Can't All Be Zingers.

The song failed to chart.

Description 

This song features bassist Les Claypool soulfully slapping and tapping his bass. In the video about 40 seconds of the outro were removed.
It appears to be about the pointlessness of mundane activities such as waiting in line at Department of Motor Vehicles, going to the dentist and sitting on cold toilet seats etc., and seeking relief through marijuana. The lyrics reference the previous album Sailing the Seas of Cheese.

Music video 

The video for "DMV" features live and backstage footage from the 10/1/1993 show at the Greek Theater in Berkeley, CA and clips from a toilet, animation and artwork used for the "Tommy the Cat" video. Due to the length of the song the video was cut to 4:29.

See also
 Primus discography

References 

Primus (band) songs
1993 songs
1993 singles
Interscope Records singles
Experimental rock songs
Songs written by Les Claypool
Songs written by Tim Alexander
Songs written by Larry LaLonde
Comedy rock songs